Hyatt Regency Savannah is a high-rise hotel in Savannah, Georgia. Built in 1980, it stands adjacent to Savannah City Hall at Bay Street's downtown midsection.

Originally envisioned as a 14-story structure in Savannah's Historic District, a long battle with the Historic Savannah Foundation concluded with a compromise being reached of its being limited to six storeys. Another source of controversy is that it bridged River Street, physically dividing the waterfront in two, although the air rights were actually a remnant of the preceding structure, the Wilcox and Gibbs Guano Company. A tunnel allows pedestrian and vehicle access along the street.

Facilities
The hotel has a swimming pool, a fitness center and a lounge.

Waterfront location

Previous structures
Long before the site became occupied by the hotel, two ranges of buildings — Bolton Range and Habersham & Harris Range — stood on the lot, part of Commerce Row. These buildings were replaced by the Neal Blun Building, which stood between 1889 and 1969, and (to the west) the M. Ferst and Company grocery store. The Ferst building was completed in September 1888, but Moses Ferst, a native of Bavaria, died eleven months later, aged 60.

References

External links

Hotels in Savannah, Georgia
Hotel buildings completed in 1980
Savannah Historic District
Hyatt Hotels and Resorts